The New Jersey Herald is a newspaper published six days (Sunday-Friday) every week. Its headquarters are in Newton, New Jersey. It is the only daily newspaper published in Sussex County, New Jersey and one of the oldest in the state. It has a distribution that reaches into both Morris County and Warren County in New Jersey, as well as Pike County, Pennsylvania, and Orange County, New York.

History
The New Jersey Herald was first published in 1829 on a weekly basis, making it one of New Jersey's oldest published newspapers. In 1925, the paper got its first permanent home when a one-story building was built on High Street in Newton. In 1968, its headquarters moved to its current location at 2 Spring Street. The New Jersey Sunday Herald first published on June 11, 1962. In 1969, it was sold to American Newspapers Inc. The daily edition was first published March 16, 1970. Quincy Newspapers acquired the company in March 1980. On May 16, 2019, it was announced that GateHouse Media had purchased the New Jersey Herald. The 2 Spring Street building was not part of the sale and was sold separately. Soon after its purchase, its parent company, New Media Investment Group, bought Gannett in a merger that assumed its name and its headquarters in Virginia, with Mike Reed as CEO. Today, The New Jersey Herald is published six days a week (Sunday-Friday, excluding Saturday).

Coverage
The New Jersey Herald covers many local news and sporting events mainly throughout Sussex County, and regularly publishes articles from the Associated Press that cover state, national, and world events.

References

External links
Official Website

Sussex County, New Jersey
Newspapers published in New Jersey
Newspapers established in 1829
Gannett publications
1829 establishments in New Jersey